Lorna Want (born 28 June 1987) is an Olivier Award-winning British theatre actress. She most recently played Princess Anne in the workshop reading of Roman Holiday, a new musical based on the 1953 film starring Audrey Hepburn and Gregory Peck.

Career
Want made her West End debut at the age of 15, playing Juliet in a new musical version of Romeo and Juliet, at the Piccadilly Theatre. Her other West End work includes: Ariel Moore in Footloose (Novello Theatre Original Cast), Mistress in Andrew Lloyd Webber's new revival of Evita (Adelphi), Monteen in Parade (Donmar Warehouse), Luisa in the new revival of The Fantasticks (Duchess), Laura in Dreamboats and Petticoats (Playhouse 2010), and Cynthia Weil in Beautiful: The Carole King Musical (Aldwych), for which she won an Olivier Award. She played Flic in the one-woman musical Girl in a Crisis, which made its debut performance at London's Crazy Coqs, Live at Zedel. She also appeared in the I Dream comedy series, along with a popular teen group S Club 8, where she played Natalie.

Want's regional and touring work includes: Young Cosette in Les Misérables (Birmingham Hippodrome 1997), Ariel Moore in Footloose" (UK Tours 2006 and 2011), Gabriella in the original British cast of High School Musical" (UK Tour 2008), the title role in Sleeping Beauty (Bromley Churchill 2009/10), Wendy in Peter Pan (Woking New Victoria 2011 and Manchester Opera House 2012), Hope Harcourt in Anything Goes (Kilworth House Theatre 2013), Maid Marian in Robin Hood (Cambridge Arts Theatre), and Winnie Tate in Annie Get Your Gun (UK Tour 2014).

She appeared in an episode of Casualty on 15 September 2007, and an episode of Doctors in 2012.

Awards and nominations

References

External links 
 

1987 births
Living people